The 1982 Coppa Italia Final was the final of the 1981–82 Coppa Italia. The match was played over two legs on 5 and 20 May 1982 between Internazionale and Torino. Internazionale won 2–1 on aggregate.

First leg

Second leg

References
Coppa Italia 1981/82 statistics at rsssf.com
 https://www.calcio.com/calendario/ita-coppa-italia-1981-1982-finale/2/
 https://www.worldfootball.net/schedule/ita-coppa-italia-1981-1982-finale/2/

Coppa Italia Finals
Coppa Italia Final 1982
Coppa Italia Final 1982